Swimming was contested at the 2013 Summer Universiade from July 10 to 17 in Kazan, Russia. The swimming competitions was held at the Akcharlak Swimming Pool and the Aquatics Place, while the open water competitions was held at the Rowing Centre.

Medal summary

Medal table

Men's events

Women's events

References

External links
2013 Summer Universiade – Swimming
Results book

2013 in swimming
Swimming at the Summer Universiade
2013 Summer Universiade events